Toni Gorupec (born 4 July 1993) is a Croatian professional footballer who plays for Cypriot outfit Ethnikos Achna as a right back.

Club career
On 20 September 2013, Gorupec made his professional debut playing for Lokomotiva against Hrvatski Dragovoljac where he started the match.

References

External links
 
 
 
 HNL statistika profile
 Toni Gorupec at Footballdatabase

1993 births
Living people
Footballers from Zagreb
Association football fullbacks
Croatian footballers
Croatia youth international footballers
Croatia under-21 international footballers
GNK Dinamo Zagreb players
NK Sesvete players
NK Lokomotiva Zagreb players
FC Astra Giurgiu players
Vitória F.C. players
C.D. Santa Clara players
NK Hrvatski Dragovoljac players
NK Rudeš players
Ethnikos Achna FC players
First Football League (Croatia) players
Croatian Football League players
Liga I players
Primeira Liga players
Liga Portugal 2 players
Second Football League (Croatia) players
Cypriot First Division players
Croatian expatriate footballers
Expatriate footballers in Romania
Croatian expatriate sportspeople in Romania
Expatriate footballers in Portugal
Croatian expatriate sportspeople in Portugal
Expatriate footballers in Cyprus
Croatian expatriate sportspeople in Cyprus